Li Yu (937 – 15 August 978), before 961 known as Li Congjia, also known as Li Houzhu (literally "Last Ruler Li" or "Last Lord Li"), was the third ruler of the Southern Tang state during imperial China's Five Dynasties and Ten Kingdoms period. He reigned from 961 until 976, when he was captured by the invading Song dynasty armies which annexed his kingdom. He died by poison on orders of Emperor Taizong of Song after 2 years as an exiled prisoner.

Although an incompetent ruler, he was a representative lyric poet during his era, to the extent of having been called the "first true master" of the ci form.

Family
Parents
Father: Li Jing
Mother: Empress Guangmu (d.965) of the Zhong clan
Consort and their respective issue(s)
Queen Zhaohui, of the Zhou clan, personal name Ehuang
Li Zhongyu (958-994), Duke Qingyuan, first son
Li Zhongxuan (961-964), Prince Huaixian, second son
Queen Zhou the Younger, of the Zhou clan
Baoyi, of the Huang clan
Gongren, of the Bao clan
Gongren, of the Zang clan

Early life
In the same Chinese year Li Congjia was born, his grandfather Xu Zhigao, also known as Xu Gao (Li Bian) founded the state Qi, renaming it Tang (known as the Southern Tang) 2 years later. When Li Congjia was 6, his father Li Jing became the next Southern Tang emperor. With Li Jing naming his younger brother Li Jingsui his heir apparent, his sixth eldest son Li Congjia seemed unlikely to ever succeed the throne. However, many of Li Congjia's brothers died very young, and after the death of the second eldest brother Li Hongmao in 951, Li Congjia all of a sudden found himself right behind Li Hongji — the eldest brother — and uncle Li Jingsui in the succession line.

Li Hongji, a withdrawn and troubled young man, resented his crown prince uncle, whom he saw as a political enemy standing in his way. He also disliked his younger brother Li Congjia, even though they shared the same biological mother, Empress Zhong. Fearing the possible results of this family enmity, Li Congjia tried hard to be inconspicuous and focused on the arts, including poetry, painting and music. He loved reading, a passion encouraged by his father, also an acclaimed poet. At the age of 17, Li Congjia married Zhou Ehuang, chancellor Zhou Zong's daughter and a year his senior. Lady Zhou was not only highly educated but also multi-talented in music and the arts and the young couple enjoyed a very intimate relationship.

Accession to the throne
In 955, a year after Li Congjia's marriage, Southern Tang was invaded by Later Zhou. The resistance war did not end until spring 958, after Li Jing ceded all prefectures north of the Yangtze River to his powerful northern neighbor. Li Jing also relinquished all imperial trappings, degrading his own title from emperor to king. The national humiliation was soon followed by familial tragedy: later that year Li Hongji poisoned uncle Li Jingsui to death, which was followed by his own death a few months later, allegedly hastened by many encounters with Li Jingsui's vengeful ghost.

Not long after Li Hongji's death in 959, Li Congjia was given the post of royal secretary so that he could familiarize himself of governmental affairs. However, despite being the king's eldest surviving son, a few ministers considered him too dissolute and weak for the crown prince position, including Zhong Mo, who pleaded to have Li Congjia's younger brother Li Congshan chosen instead. Li Jing found Zhong's suggestion offensive and demoted him.

Suffering from poor health, Li Jing decided to transfer all responsibilities to his successor. He named Li Congjia the crown prince in spring 961 to take over in the capital Jinling (modern Nanjing, Jiangsu) while he retired to the southern city of Hongzhou (modern Nanchang, Jiangxi). A few months later he died, and Li Congjia officially succeeded the throne, not without a last-second effort by Li Congshan to challenge him. By then Zhong Mo had also died, so Li Congshan asked chancellor Xu You to bring Li Jing's last will to him. Xu refused and confided in Li Congjia of Li Congshan's intentions. Li Congjia — changing his name to Li Yu — did not punish his younger brother other than a slight demotion.

As Southern Tang ruler

Appeasing the Song Dynasty
A year before Li Yu ascended the throne, Southern Tang's nominal overlord Later Zhou had been replaced by the Song dynasty established by former Later Zhou general Zhao Kuangyin, who had earlier participated in several campaigns against Southern Tang. Knowing the limit of Southern Tang's military strength and trying hard to be subservient to the northern court, Li Yu immediately sent a high official Feng Yanlu with a letter — whose language was of extreme humility — to inform Song of his succession. Things got to a rocky start: during his accession to the throne Li Yu built a golden rooster, a symbol of imperial power, the news of which infuriated Zhao Kuangyin. In the end, the Southern Tang ambassador in the Song capital of Bianliang (modern Kaifeng, Henan) had to give the explanation that the golden rooster was actually a "weird bird" to satisfy the Song emperor.

Such an embarrassing relationship would define Li's entire reign, as tribute payments, both regular and irregular, drained the Southern Tang treasury. Essentially Li was ready to fulfill Emperor Taizu of Song's every demand except go to Bianliang himself. In 963, Li Congshan who accompanied a tributary mission was held hostage in Bianliang and had to write letters on behalf of the Song emperor asking his elder brother also join him at the Song court. Li Yu, naturally, did not heed the request.

Successive deaths in the family
Li Yu remained close to his musically gifted wife Zhou Ehuang — now Queen Zhou — so close that he sometimes canceled government meetings to enjoy her performances. The absences continued until a censor spoke out against it.

In around 964, the second of the couple's two sons, a three-year-old still called by his milk name Ruibao, died unexpectedly. Li would mourn his son by himself so as not to sadden his wife more than necessary, but Queen Zhou was completely devastated and quickly deteriorated in health. During her illness, Li attended her so devotedly that he did not disrobe for days. When the queen finally succumbed to illness, Li mourned so bitterly until "his bones stuck out and he could stand up only with the aid of a staff." In addition to several grieving poems, he chiseled the roughly 2000 characters of his "Dirge for the Zhaohui Queen Zhou" — "Zhaohui" being her posthumous name — to her headstone himself. Part of the dirge read (as translated by Daniel Bryant):

While Li Yu was almost certainly sincere in his love for his wife, during her last days he also engaged in a secret sexual relationship with Queen Zhou the Younger, the queen's younger sister, who was only around 14 at that time. Worst of all, the queen discovered the "affair" which probably hastened her demise and multiplied Li Yu's regret. A few months later, in late 965, disaster stroke again: Queen Dowager Zhong died after several months of attentive care-taking by Li. The subsequent mourning period delayed Li's marriage to the younger Lady Zhou until 968.

Deaths of Lin Renzhao and Pan You
After conquering Jingnan, the Hunan region and Later Shu, the Song Dynasty army set off to invade Southern Han in 971, Southern Tang's southwestern neighbor. Lin Renzhao, the Southern Tang military governor of Zhenhai Command centering in Wuchang (in modern Hubei), believed the opportunity golden to attack the Song cities around Yangzhou (in modern Jiangsu) as the main Song army would be a long distance away and already severely fatigued. Li Yu immediately rejected Lin's request: "Stop the nonsense talks, (stop) destroying (our) country!"

What Li was perhaps unaware was a year before, the Song military had gotten hold of an important chart with detailed measurements of Yangtze River crossing points, provided by a Southern Tang defector named Fan Ruoshui. After the conquest of Southern Han, their next step was to eliminate Lin Renzhao. In 974, Emperor Taizu of Song got hold of a Lin portrait through agents working in Southern Tang, and Li Congshan, the hostage kept in Bianliang, was then made to believe that Lin's loyalty was with Song. When Li Yu was told of this, he without a thorough investigation secretly poisoned Lin to death. Chancellor Chen Qiao angrily reacted to Lin's death: "Seeing loyal ministers killed, I don't know where I will die!".

Fall of Southern Tang

Not known for his governing skill, Houzhu was nevertheless a highly accomplished scholar, he allowed himself indulgence with artistic and literature pursuits, with little regard to the strong Song Kingdom that was eyeing its weaker neighbor. In 971, Houzhu dropped the name of Tang from its Kingdom's name, in a desperate move to please the mighty Emperor Taizu of Song.

Of the many other kingdoms surrounding the Southern Tang, only Wuyue to the east had yet to fall. The Southern Tang's turn came in 974, when, after several refusals to summons to the Song court, on the excuse of illness, Song dynasty armies invaded. After a year long siege of the Southern Tang capital, modern Nanjing, Li Houzhu surrendered, in 975; and, he and his family were taken as captives to the Song capital at present-day Kaifeng. In a later poem, Li wrote about the shame and regret he had on the day he was taken away from Jinling (as translated by Hsiung Ting):

Devotion to the arts
Although, Li Yu indeed was a great exponent and developer of the cí poetry form, which sometimes or often seems to characterize poetry of the Song Dynasty, there is also some difficulty in categorizing him as a Song poet: the Southern Tang state is more of a continuation of Tang than a precursor on the Song side of the divide of the history of the Tang-Song transition, also known as the Five Dynasties and Ten Kingdoms period. Li Yu represents both a continuation of the Tang poetry tradition, as well as representing the cí poetic style which is so especially associated with the poetry of Song.

Li Houzhu devoted much of his time to pleasure-making and literature, and this is reflected in his early poems. A second phase of Li's cí poems seems to have been the development of an even sadder style after the death of his wife, in 964. His best-known, and saddest, poems were composed during the years of his captivity, after he formally abdicated his reign to the Song, in 975. He was created the Marquess of Wei Ming ("Marquess of Disobeyed Edicts"), a token title only: actually, he was a prisoner, though with the outward accoutrements of a prince. Li's works from this period dwell on his regret for the lost kingdom and the pleasures it had brought him.

He developed the ci by broadening its scope from love to history and philosophy, particularly in his later works. He also introduced the two stanza form, and made great use of contrasts between longer lines of nine characters and shorter ones of three and five. Only 45 of his ci poems survive, thirty of which have been verified to be his authentic works, the other of which are possibly composed by other writers: also, seventeen shi style poems remain to his credit. His story remains very popular in many Cantonese operas.

Death
He was poisoned by the Song emperor Taizong in 978, after he had written a poem that, in a veiled manner, lamented the destruction of his empire and the rape of his second wife Empress Zhou the Younger by the Song emperor. After his death, he was posthumously created the Prince of Wu.

Writing

Cí poetry

The roughly 40 (some of which incomplete owing to damaged manuscripts) cí poems possibly written by Li Yu are summarized in the table below. The cí as a poetic form follows set patterns or tunes.

A few poems have been set to music in modern times, most notably the three songs in superstar Teresa Teng's 1983 album Light Exquisite Feelings. Some of the songs are mentioned below.

Poetry Examples
Poems like these are often invoked in later periods of strife and confusion by literary figures.

Alone Up the Western Tower

One of Li Yu's most famous poems, popularly known as "Alone Up the Western Tower", was written after his capture. Here the poem is translated by Chan Hong-mo:

This was also rendered into a song by Teresa Teng.

Jiangnan Remembrance (望江南), second stanza

Shi poetry

Li Yu's poems in the form of shi include:
 "Bìng Qǐ Tí Shān Shě Bì" ("Getting up while Ill: Written Upon the Wall of My Mountain Lodge")
 "Bìng Zhōng Gǎn Huái" ("Feelings while Ill")
 "Bìng Zhōng Shū Shì" ("Written while Ill")
 "Dào Shī" ("Poem of Mourning")
 "Dù Zhōng Jiāng Wàng Shí Chéng Qì Xià" ("Gazing at Stone City from Mid-River and Weeping")
 "Gǎn Huái" ("My Feelings") — 2 poems
 "Jiǔ Yuè Shí Rì Ǒu Shū" ("Jotted Down on the Tenth Day of the Ninth Month")
 "Méi Huā" ("Plum Blossoms") — 2 poems
 "Qiū Yīng" ("Autumn Warbler")
 "Shū Líng Yán Shǒu Jīn" ("Written on the Napkin for a Sacrificial Banquet")
 "Shū Pí Pá Bèi" ("Written on the Back of a Pipa")
 "Sòng Dèng Wáng Èr Shí Dì Cóng Yì Mù Xuān Chéng" ("On Saying Farewell to My Younger Brother Chongyi, the Prince of Deng, Who is Going Away to Govern Xuancheng") — including a long letter
 "Tí jīn lóu zi hòu" ("Written at the end of the Jinlouzi") — including a preface
 "Wǎn Chí" ("Poem of Mourning") — 2 poems

"To the Tune of Liǔ Zhī" mentioned in the cí section may also be classified as a shi.

Prose writing
Though miscellaneous in character, Li Yu's surviving prose writings also demonstrated his poetic genius. For example, "Dirge for the Zhaohui Queen Zhou" is rhymed and almost entirely in regular four-character metre, resembling the dominant fu form a millennium before.

Calligraphy

Li Yu's calligraphy style has been dubbed "Golden Inlaid Dagger" for its perceived force and clarity. As one Song Dynasty writer noted: "The large characters are like split bamboo, the small ones like clusters of needles; altogether unlike anything done with a brush!"

Television series
Three independent television series focused on the complex relationships between Li Yu (Li Houzhu), Emperor Taizu of Song (Zhao Kuangyin) and the various women in their lives. They are:
 The Sword and the Song, a 1986 Singaporean series starring Li Wenhai as Li Yu.
 Love, Sword, Mountain & River, a 1996 Taiwanese series starring Chin Feng as Li Yu.
 Li Houzhu and Zhao Kuangyin, a 2006 Chinese series starring Nicky Wu as Li Yu.

See also
Song poetry
Tang poetry

Notes and references

Sources
Primary sources
  
  
  
  
  
  
  

Secondary sources

Davis, A. R. (Albert Richard), Editor and Introduction, The Penguin Book of Chinese Verse. Baltimore: Penguin Books (1970).

Landau, Julie. 1994. Beyond spring tz'u poems of the Sung dynasty. Translations from the Asian classics. New York: Columbia University Press.  
Liu, Kezhang. 2006. An appreciation and English translation of one hundred Chines (i.e. Chinese) cis during the Tang and Song dynasties. Pittsburgh, Penn: RoseDog Books.  
MacKintosh, Duncan and Alan Ayling. 1967. A collection of Chinese lyrics. Nashville: Vanderbilt University Press.

External links

 Index of Poems of Li Yu

Southern Tang emperors
Southern Tang poets
Song dynasty poets
Song dynasty politicians from Jiangsu
Song dynasty Buddhists
Chinese Buddhist monarchs
930s births
978 deaths
Murdered Chinese emperors
Poets from Jiangsu
Politicians from Nanjing
Writers from Nanjing
10th-century Chinese poets
Deaths by poisoning